The 1993 Mount Union Purple Raiders football team was an American football team that represented the University of Mount Union in the Ohio Athletic Conference (OAC) during the 1993 NCAA Division III football season. In their eighth year under head coach Larry Kehres, the Purple Raiders compiled a perfect 14–0 record, won the OAC championship, and outscored opponents by a total of 582 to 120. They qualified for the NCAA Division III playoffs and advanced to the national championship team where they defeated , 34–24.

The team was led on offense by quarterback Jim Ballard who set NCAA Division III records for touchdown passes in a season (54) and in a game (eight vs. St. John's in the semifinals). He finished the season with 4,555 passing yards and 54 touchdowns and won the 1993 Gagliardi Trophy as the best player in Division III football.

The team played its home games at Mount Union Stadium in Alliance, Ohio. Ballard threw eight touchdown passes in the semifinal game against St. John's.

Schedule

References

Mount Union
Mount Union Purple Raiders football seasons
NCAA Division III Football Champions
College football undefeated seasons
Mount Union Purple Raiders football